Land Borders Law of the People's Republic of China is a law to provide for the strengthening of its borders. It was adopted on 23 October 2021 and officially in effect as of 1 January 2022. The law covers border infrastructure, development, civilian employment and military-civilian relations.

References

Further reading 
 

Law of the People's Republic of China